The 2015–16 Samford Bulldogs men's basketball team represented Samford University during the 2015–16 NCAA Division I men's basketball season. The Bulldogs, led by second year head coach Scott Padgett, played their home games at the Pete Hanna Center and were members of the Southern Conference. They finished the season 14–19, 4–14 in SoCon play to finish in a tie for eighth place. They defeated VMI in the first round of the SoCon tournament to advance to the quarterfinals where they lost to Chattanooga.

Roster

Schedule

|-
!colspan=9 style="background:#ca1009; color:#14295e;"| Regular season

|-
!colspan=9 style="background:#ca1009; color:#14295e;"| SoCon tournament

References

Samford Bulldogs men's basketball seasons
Samford
Samford
Samford